Coronin, actin binding protein, 1B also known as CORO1B is a protein which in humans is encoded by the CORO1B gene. Members of the coronin family, such as CORO1B, are WD repeat-containing actin-binding proteins that regulate cell motility.

Function 

A mammalian coronin enriches at the leading edge of migrating cells. Studies related to this protein are as follows:

 Coronin 1B antagonizes cortactin and remodels Arp2/3-containing actin branches in lamellipodia.
 F-actin binding is essential for coronin 1B function in vivo.
 Coronin 1B coordinates Arp2/3 complex and cofilin activities at the leading edge.
 Phosphorylation of coronin 1B by protein kinase C regulates interaction with Arp2/3 and cell motility.
 In vivo and in vitro characterization of novel neuronal plasticity factors identified following spinal cord injury.
 Isolation, cloning, and characterization of a new mammalian coronin family member, coroninse, which is regulated within the protein kinase C signaling pathway.

References